Pterodon is a genus of flowering plants in the family Fabaceae. It belongs to the subfamily Faboideae.

Pterodon can be distinguished from other members of the Dipterygeae as follows:
the leaf rachis is exalate, the fruit is a cryptosamara with oil glands in the epicarp, the seed testa is smooth and the raphe is apparent, with the hilum in a lateral position covered by an aril and a smooth embryo.

Species
It contains only two species:
Pterodon abruptus (Moric.) Benth.

Pterodon emarginatus Vogel

References

Dipterygeae
Fabaceae genera